Catopta rocharva is a moth in the family Cossidae. It was described by Leo Sheljuzhko in 1943. It is found in Tajikistan (Gissar, western Pamir) and north-eastern Afghanistan.

References

Natural History Museum Lepidoptera generic names catalog

Moths described in 1943
Catoptinae